Zani may refer to:

People
 Zani Jacobsen (1928–1993), American sculptor 
 Andrea Zani (1696–1757), Italian violinist, composer
 Angelo Vincenzo Zani (born 1950), archbishop, Vatican official 
 Celso Zani, also Giuliano Zani, (born 1580), Catholic bishop
 Costanzo Zani (1622–1694), Roman Catholic Bishop of Imola
 Federico Zani (born 1989), Italian rugby union player
 Giselda Zani (1909–1975), Uruguayan poet, short story writer, art critic
 Marco Aurelio Zani de Ferranti (1801–1878), Italian classical guitarist, composer
 Marie-Joséphe Zani-Fé Touam-Bona (1933–2001), politician in the Central African Republic (CAR)
 Marigona Zani (born 1996), Albanian football goalkeeper 
 Mauro Zani (born 1949), Italian politician
 Octávio Zani (1902 – date of death unknown), Brazilian athlete

Toponyms
 Ab Zani, village in Kohgiluyeh and Boyer-Ahmad Province, Iran
 Galleh Zani, village in Bushehr Province, Iran
 Kart Zani, village in Hormozgan Province, Iran
 Zani, Iran, village in South Khorasan Province, Iran

Other
 Palazzo Zani, Bologna,  Renaissance palace in central Bologna, region of Emilia Romagna, Italy
 Qama Zani, an act of mourning by Shia Muslims of Iran and South Asia
 Zani i Ri (English: New Voice), fortnightly newspaper published in Albania
 Zani Çaushi, Albanian criminal group active in Vlora during 1997–99